Mr. Big is the debut album by the American rock supergroup Mr. Big. Produced by Kevin Elson, the album proved a partial commercial success, reaching the 46th slot on the Billboard 200 chart. Lead-off single "Addicted to that Rush", featuring the band's aggressive guitar and bass playing, also brought the group some mainstream attention, reaching the No. 39 slot on the Billboard Mainstream Rock chart. 300,000 copies were sold, according to a Musician magazine interview with Mr. Big in 1990.

Several of the songs from the album became live staples of the band, and have since been included in various live albums. The group followed up the album with Lean Into It in 1991, which represented a critical breakthrough.

The song "30 Days in the Hole" was originally recorded by British rock band Humble Pie on the 1972 album Smokin'. Bassist Billy Sheehan revealed on an interview on Nikki Sixx's radio show "Sixx Sense" that "Wind Me Up" is based on "Oh, Pretty Woman" by Roy Orbison played backwards.

Track listing

Personnel
Mr. Big
Eric Martin – lead vocals
Paul Gilbert – guitar
Billy Sheehan – bass guitar
Pat Torpey – drums

Production
Kevin Elson - producer, engineer, mixing
Tom Size, Wally Buck - additional engineers
Bob Ludwig - mastering at Masterdisk, New York

Charts

Album

Singles

Certifications

References 

Mr. Big (American band) albums
1989 debut albums
Atlantic Records albums
Albums produced by Kevin Elson